Reunion is a 2020 New Zealand horror film written and directed by Jake Mahaffy and stars Julia Ormond, Emma Draper, John Bach, Cohen Holloway and Nancy Brunning.

Cast
The cast include:
 Julia Ormond as Ivy
 Emma Draper as Ellie
 John Bach as Jack
 Cohen Holloway as Gus
 Nancy Brunning as Kathy

Release
The film premiered at the virtual 2020 Nightstream Film Festival in October 2020. It also was part of the Montclair Film Festival, the Telluride Horror Show, and the Indie Memphis Film Festival. Dark Sky Films is set to release Reunion theatrically in select locations and on VOD (simultaneous release) on February 5, 2021.

References

External links
 

2020 films
2020s New Zealand films
New Zealand horror films
2020s English-language films